The 1999–2000 Druga HNL was the ninth season of Druga HNL, the second level league in Croatian football.

The format of the league was unchanged from the 1998–99 season. A total of 17 clubs competed in Druga HNL this season, in a double round-robin format (following relegation from 1998–99 Prva HNL, Mladost 127 was supposed to compete in Druga HNL, but the club folded due to financial difficulties and Druga HNL was reduced to 17 teams before the season started).

Clubs

League table

See also
1999–2000 Prva HNL
1999–2000 Croatian Cup

External links
1999–2000 in Croatian Football at Rec.Sport.Soccer Statistics Foundation
Official website  

First Football League (Croatia) seasons
Druga HNL
Cro